The 1907 Auckland City mayoral election was part of the New Zealand local elections held that same year. In 1907, elections were held for the Mayor of Auckland plus other local government positions including fifteen city councillors. The polling was conducted using the standard first-past-the-post electoral method.

Background
Incumbent mayor Arthur Myers was re-elected with a huge majority over two challengers.

Three extra seats on the Auckland City Council were to be filled than at last municipal elections after the Council having by special order increased the membership from 12 to 15.

Mayoralty results

Councillor results

References

Mayoral elections in Auckland
1907 elections in New Zealand
Politics of the Auckland Region
1900s in Auckland